The Independents for Croatia ( or NHR) is a conservative political party in Croatia. The Party was founded on 1 June 2017, and officially registered with the Ministry of Public Administration on 2 June 2017.

History
Bruna Esih was elected as first party president at the party's founding congress. The party secretary-general is Ivo Mikić, while Krešimir Kartelo serves as a political secretary and spokesperson. Party has no vice-president, but only the presidency. Following 2016 parliamentary election, Bruna Esih and Zlatko Hasanbegović entered Croatian Parliament on the Croatian Democratic Union electoral list; Esih as independent, and Hasanbegović as a party member. After HDZ decided to enter into coalition with liberal Croatian People's Party, they decided to leave HDZ parliamentary club and form their own with another independent conservative MP representing Croatian diaspora, Željko Glasnović, and move to the opposition. Following 2017 Zagreb local elections, Party entered Zagreb Assembly and eventually supported mayor Milan Bandić thus helping him to ensure majority.

Election history

Legislative

European Parliament

References

2017 establishments in Croatia
Anti-communist parties
Conservative parties in Croatia
Croatian nationalist parties
National conservative parties
Nationalist parties in Croatia
Political parties established in 2017
Right-wing populist parties